Deolali Assembly constituency is one of the 288 constituencies of the Vidhan Sabha (Assembly) of Maharashtra state in Western India.  It is located in the Nashik district, and is one of the six assembly segments under Nashik (Lok Sabha constituency).

Members of Assembly
 1967: S. N. Deshmukh, INC
 1972: Nivruttirao B. Gaidhani, IND
 1978: Babulal Soma Ahire, IND
 1980: Babulal Soma Ahire, INC(U)
 1985: Bhikchand Haribhau Donde, BJP
 1990: Babanrao Gholap, Shivsena
 1995: Babanrao Gholap, Shivsena
 1999: Babanrao Gholap, Shivsena
 2004: Babanrao Gholap, Shivsena
 2009: Babanrao Gholap, Shivsena
 2014: Yogesh Babanrao Gholap, Shivsena
 2019: Saroj Babulal Ahire , NCP

References

Assembly constituencies of Nashik district
Assembly constituencies of Maharashtra